Trigonopterus moatensis is a species of flightless weevil in the genus Trigonopterus endemic to Sulawesi, Indonesia. It was described in 2019.

References 

moatensis
Beetles of Asia
Insects of Indonesia
Endemic fauna of Indonesia